Chromalizus is a genus of beetle in the family Cerambycidae.

Species
 Chromalizus basaloides Lepesme, 1950
 Chromalizus fragrans (Dalman, 1817)
 Chromalizus rugosus (Aurivillius, 1912)
 Chromalizus sjoestedti (Aurivillius, 1903)
 Chromalizus speciosus (Guérin-Méneville, 1844)
 Chromalizus subfragrans Lepesme & Breuning, 1955
 Chromalizus truncatiscapus Lepesme, 1950
 Chromalizus afer (Linnaeus, 1771)
 Chromalizus afroides Lepesme, 1950
 Chromalizus angolensis Veiga-Ferreira, 1971
 Chromalizus argentipes Juhel & Bentanachs, 2010
 Chromalizus aureovittis (Kolbe, 1893)
 Chromalizus basalis (White, 1853)
 Chromalizus basilewskyi Fuchs, 1974
 Chromalizus calceatus (Aurivillius, 1903)
 Chromalizus dekeyseri Lepesme, 1950
 Chromalizus leucorhaphis (Gerstaecker, 1855)
 Chromalizus procerus Schmidt, 1922
 Chromalizus rhodoscelis (Jordan, 1903)
 Chromalizus simulatus (Chevrolat, 1856)
 Chromalizus socius (Jordan, 1894)

References

Callichromatini